Charles Reiss is an American linguistics professor  teaching at Concordia University in Montreal.

His contributions to linguistics have been in the area of phonology, historical linguistics, and cognitive science. Along with colleague Mark Hale, he is a proponent of substance-free phonology, the idea that phonetic substance is inaccessible to phonological computation (see paper 'Substance abuse and dysfunctionalism').

Selected works
2018. Bale, Alan, and Charles Reiss. Phonology: A formal introduction. MIT Press, 2018.
2017. Volenec, Veno, and Charles Reiss. "Cognitive Phonetics: The Transduction of Distinctive Features at the Phonology-Phonetics Interface." Biolinguistics 11 (2017): 251-294.
2014 (estimated). Hale, M., Kissock, M., & Reiss, C. An I-Language Approach to Phonologization and Lexification. Chapter  20. The Oxford Handbook of Historical Phonology. Edited by Patrick Honeybone and Joseph Salmons 
2013. Isac D., & Reiss, C. 2013.  I-language: An Introduction to Linguistics as Cognitive Science, 2nd edition. URL: http://linguistics.concordia.ca/i-language/ Oxford University Press. 
2012. Towards a bottom-up approach to phonological typology. 2012. In Towards a Biolinguistic Understanding of Grammar: Essays on Interfaces, ed. A.M. di Sciullo. John Benjamins. Pages 169-191.
2009. Intermodular explanation in cognitive science: An example from phonology. In Pylyshyn Papers, Don Dedrick and Lana Trick, eds. Cambridge, MA: MIT Press. 2009. 17pp. 
 2008. Hale, M., & Reiss, C. (2008),The Phonological Enterprise, Oxford: Oxford University Press
 2008.  I-Language: An Introduction to Linguistics as a Cognitive Science. Oxford University Press.
 2008. Constraining the Learning Path Without Constraints, or The OCP and NoBanana. In Rules, Constraints and Phonological Phenomena, A. Nevins & B. Vaux, (eds.) Oxford University Press. 2008. 
 2007.   Oxford Handbook of Linguistic Interfaces. Oxford University Press.
2007. Computing Long-distance Dependencies in Vowel Harmony. In Biolinguistics 1:28-48 (with F. Mailhot).  
 2007. Microvariation, Variation, and the Features of Universal Grammar. Lingua 117.4. 2007. With Mark Hale and Madelyn Kissock.
 2003.  The subset principle in phonology: Why the tabula can't be rasa. In Journal of Linguistics 219-244.
 2003. Deriving the feature-filling / feature-changing contrast: An application to Hungarian vowel harmony. In Linguistic Inquiry. 199-224
2003. Quantification in Structural Descriptions:Attested and Unattested Patterns. In  The Linguistic Review 20.
2001. L2 Evidence for the Structure of the L1 Lexicon. International Journal of English Studies 1: 219-239.
 2000. Mark Hale & Charles Reiss. Substance abuse and dysfunctionalism: Current trends in phonology. Linguistic Inquiry 31: 157-169 (2000).

References

Phonologists
Living people
Linguists from the United States
Academic staff of Concordia University
Year of birth missing (living people)